The NWA United Kingdom Heavyweight Championship is a professional wrestling championship in the NWA UK Hammerlock promotion. The championship has existed since 2001.

Title history

See also

Professional wrestling in the United Kingdom
Professional wrestling promotions in the United Kingdom

References

External links
Wrestling-Titles.com

NWA UK Hammerlock championships
National Wrestling Alliance championships
Heavyweight wrestling championships
National professional wrestling championships